Tamás Sneider (born 11 June 1972) is a Hungarian politician, who was leader of the Jobbik from May 2018 to January 2020. Before that he was one of the vice-presidents of the party from 2009 to 2018. He was a member of the parliament from 2010 to 2022. Between 2010 and 2014 he served as the president of the Committee of Youth, Social and Family Policies of the Hungarian National Assembly. He was one of the deputy speakers of the National Assembly from 2014 to 2020 and member of the Committee on Social Welfare.

Origins 
Sneider's family has been living in Aldebrő in Heves County for 300 years. His ancestors were workers of German origin. His grandfather fought in World War II on the Eastern front and got wounded in the Battle of Torda.

Education 
He graduated in 1991 from Agricultural Technical College of Eger. Since 2009 he studied history at Esterházy Károly University, Eger.

Political career 
In 1992 he became a founding member of the Association of Patriotic Youth. Sneider was a leading figure of the far-right underground skinhead movement under the nom-de-guerre Roy in the early 1990s. According to a court verdict, he physically assaulted a man of Romani origin. The court sentenced him to suspended prison at the time.

In 2000 he joined MIÉP and became the president of the Eger branch. Between 2002 and 2006 he was the member of the city council of Eger. Between 2002 and 2007 he was the president of MIÉP in Heves county. Sneider participated in the occupation of MTV Headquarters during the 2006 protests in Hungary.

In 2007 he became the member of Jobbik and was elected as the president of the party's local branch in Eger. Since 2009 he has become the party's president in Heves county. In the 2009 EP elections he ran on the 16th place of Jobbik's list. In 2009 he was elected as the vice-president of the party.

Since 2010 he has been the member of the Parliament. Currently, he is the member of the Committee on Social Welfare. In 2014 he was elected as the vice-speaker of the Hungarian National Assembly with great majority.

Since 2018 he was the president of Jobbik. He was considered the moderate candidate to be the new leader of the party in the Jobbik congress, which followed the party losing the 2018 Hungarian parliamentary election. He ran against László Toroczkai. Sneider won the leadership with 53.8% of the votes.

In May 2020, he left the parliamentary group of Jobbik.

In February 21 2021, he joined to the Civil Response political party.

References 

Living people
Hungarian Justice and Life Party politicians
Jobbik politicians
Members of the National Assembly of Hungary (2010–2014)
Members of the National Assembly of Hungary (2014–2018)
Members of the National Assembly of Hungary (2018–2022)
1972 births
People from Eger
Hungarian people of German descent